The following table indicates party affiliation in the State of Vermont:
Governor
Lieutenant Governor
Secretary of State
Attorney General
State Treasurer
State Auditor of Accounts

It also indicates historical composition:
Senate
House of Representatives
State delegation to the United States Senate
State delegation to the United States House of Representatives

1778–1883

1884–present

See also
Vermont
Politics of Vermont
Elections in Vermont
Government of Vermont

References

Politics of Vermont
Government of Vermont
Vermont